Gumi station is a railway station on the Gyeongbu Line.

The train station on the Gyeongbu line is between Apo station and Sagok station. On November 1, 1916, the company started operation as a normal station. The station was renovated in 1966 and expanded in 1982. In 2006, the company built a new history of Gumi and stopped handling cargo operation in 2007. KTX, Saemaul and Mugunghwa trains are in operation, and are in charge of passenger and ticket issuance.

History 
November 1, 1916: Opening of business as a regular station (Registration 1916-253 of the Governor-General's Office of the Joseon)

Oct. 12, 1966: Construction of a new history.

Dec. 30, 1966:  Completion of the construction of a new station.

Nearby tourist spots 
Nearby tourist attractions include:

 Geum-o mountain Provincial Park
 Dorisa (temple)

References

External links
 Cyber station information from Korail

Railway stations in North Gyeongsang Province
Gumi, North Gyeongsang
Railway stations opened in 1916